Surgical oncology is the branch of surgery applied to oncology; it focuses on the surgical management of tumors, especially cancerous tumors.

As one of several modalities in the management of cancer, the specialty of surgical oncology has evolved in steps similar to medical oncology (pharmacotherapy for cancer), which grew out of hematology, and radiation oncology, which grew out of radiology. The Ewing Society known today as the Society of Surgical Oncology was started by surgeons interested in promoting the field of oncology. Complex General Surgical Oncology was ratified by a specialty Board certification in 2011 from the American Board of Surgery. The proliferation of cancer centers will continue to popularize the field, as will developments in minimally invasive techniques, palliative surgery, and neo-adjuvant treatments.

Debate
Whether surgical oncology constitutes a medical specialty per se is the topic of a heated debate. Today, some would agree that it is simply impossible for any one surgeon to be competent in the surgical management of all malignant disease  There are currently 19 surgical oncology fellowship training programs in the United States that have been approved by the Society of Surgical Oncology and this number is expect to grow. While many general surgeons are actively involved in treating patients with malignant neoplasms, the designation of "surgical oncologist" is generally reserved for those surgeons who have completed one of the approved fellowship programs.  However, this is a matter of semantics, as many surgeons who are thoroughly involved in treating cancer patients may consider themselves to be surgical oncologists. 

Most often, surgical oncologist refers to a general surgical oncologist (a subspecialty of general surgery), but thoracic surgical oncologists, gynecologic oncologists and so forth can all be considered surgeons who specialize in treating cancer patients.

Training
The importance of training surgeons who sub-specialize in cancer surgery lies in evidence, supported by a number of clinical trials, that outcomes in surgical cancer care are positively associated to surgeon volume—i.e., the more cancer cases a surgeon treats, the more proficient he or she becomes, and his or her patients experience improved survival rates as a result. This is another controversial point, but it is generally accepted—even as common sense—that a surgeon who performs a given operation more often, will achieve superior results when compared with a surgeon who rarely performs the same procedure. This is particularly true of complex cancer resections such as, Breast Cancer Surgery, pancreaticoduodenectomy (Whipple procedure) for pancreatic cancer, and gastrectomy with extended (D2) lymphadenectomy for gastric cancer.  In the United States and Canada, fellowship trained surgical oncologists have among the longest training periods of any physicians/surgeons. In some areas like Breast Diseases and Breast Cancer there we know as Breast Surgeon the specialist that only works with patients with breast diseases and breast cancer. A training period (clinical and research) of 6 to 8 years is typical and 8–10 years is not uncommon.

Surgical oncology types and forms
These are the most common types and forms of oncological surgery:
 surgery to diagnose cancer
 surgery to stage cancer
 curative surgery
radical surgery
 surgery to debulk cancer
 palliative surgery
 supportive surgery
 reconstructive surgery
 preventive (prophylactic) surgery.

Surgical oncology Techniques
Newer surgical techniques are less invasive, use different types of surgical instruments, and lead to less pain and shorter recovery times. The most effective surgical oncology techniques are: 
 cryosurgery
 electrosurgery
 laparoscopic surgery
 laser surgery
 mohs surgery
 radiofrequency ablation
 robotic surgery and other forms of surgery.
 thoracoscopic surgery

Books
One of the first text books dedicated to surgical oncology was written by the American-Irish surgeon, Dr. Theodore O'Connell in 1981. Many publications in surgical oncology are also appearing. The majority are large reference textbooks that seemingly combine specialties that are not generally practiced by a single practitioner but cover the academic subject. A number of practical handbooks such as "surgical oncology" in the well read Oxford Handbooks series, have recently been published, perhaps alluding to the evolving practicality of this emerging discipline.

See also
Cancer Diagnostic Probe

References

External links
European Society of Surgical Oncology
Society of Surgical Oncology
Rajasthan Society of Oncology

 
Surgical specialties